The Charlton automatic rifle was a fully automatic conversion of the Lee–Enfield rifle, designed by New Zealander Philip Charlton in 1941 to act as a substitute for the Bren and Lewis gun light machine guns which were in severely short supply at the time.

Description
The original Charlton automatic rifles were converted from obsolete Lee–Metford and magazine Lee–Enfield rifles dating from as early as the Boer War, and were intended for use as semi-automatic rifles with the full-automatic capabilities retained for emergency use.  It used the 10-round Lee–Enfield magazines and modified 30-round Bren magazines. The weapon was never intended for use as a frontline combat weapon, instead being designed and adopted primarily for the New Zealand Home Guard.

There were two versions of the Charlton: the New Zealand version, as designed and manufactured by Charlton Motor Workshops in Hastings, and a version produced in Australia by Electrolux, using the SMLE Mk III* for conversion.  The two designs differed markedly in external appearance (amongst other things, the New Zealand Charlton had a forward pistol grip and bipod, whilst the Australian lacked this, making it lighter and cleaner in appearance), but shared the same operating mechanism.

Approximately 1,500 Charlton automatic rifles were manufactured in New Zealand, and nearly all of them were destroyed in an accidental fire at the ordnance depot located at the Palmerston North Show Grounds shortly after World War II.

As a result, very few Charlton automatic rifles are known to survive. Examples are found in the Imperial War Museum in London and the National Firearms Centre at the Royal Armouries Museum in Leeds in the United Kingdom; the Waiouru Army Museum and the Auckland War Memorial museum in New Zealand; and the Army Museum (Bandiana) in Australia.

See also
Ekins automatic rifle
Howard Francis semi-automatic carbine
Howell automatic rifle
Huot automatic rifle
Rieder automatic rifle

References

Bibliography
 Skennerton, Ian The Lee-Enfield Story (1993). Arms & Militaria Press, Australia. 
 Skennerton, Ian Small Arms Identification Series No. 13: Special Service Lee-Enfields; Commando & Auto Models (2001). Arms & Militaria Press, Australia.

External links

Image 1
Image 2
Similar Dutch Rifle Conversion
C&Rsenal
Forgotten Weapons
New Zealand Arms Register

Semi-automatic rifles
Light machine guns
Machine guns of New Zealand
World War II infantry weapons